Blair Andrew Pocock (born 18 June 1971) is a New Zealand cricket player who played 15 Test matches for his national side.  He was born in Papakura, New Zealand.

Pocock was one of the many openers used in the poorly performing New Zealand cricket team of the mid-1990s, but made little impact in Test cricket, averaging under 23.  The major teams that he was in were New Zealand, Auckland and Northern Districts. He is the nephew of Michael Graeme Pocock, who also played first-class cricket.

1971 births
Living people
People educated at Auckland Grammar School
New Zealand cricketers
New Zealand Test cricketers
Auckland cricketers
Northern Districts cricketers
People from Papakura
North Island cricketers